Contraconus is an extinct genus of sea snails, marine gastropod mollusks in the family Conidae.

Species
Species within the genus Contraconus include:
 Contraconus tryoni (Heilprin, 1887)

 Contraconus adversarius (Conrad 1840)

References

 Olsson A. A. & Harbison A. (1953). Pliocene Mollusca of southern Florida with special reference to those from North Saint Petersburg. Monographs of the Academy of Natural Sciences of Philadelphia 8:  1-457,  pl. 1-65

Conidae
Monotypic gastropod genera